Ayre is a surname. Notable people with the surname include:

Sir Amos Ayre (1885–1952), English shipbuilder and high-ranking Admiralty official
Bella Ayre (born 1998), Australian rules footballer
Billy Ayre (1952–2002), English footballer
Bobby Ayre (1932–2018), English former footballer
Calvin Ayre (born 1961), Canadian founder of the Bodog online gaming and entertainment brand
Charles R. Ayre (1819–1889), Newfoundland merchant and politician
Colin Ayre (born 1956), English former footballer
Garry Ayre (born 1953), Canadian former soccer player
Jack Ayre (1894–1977), Canadian entertainer
James S. Ayre (1881–1953), businessman and political figure in Newfoundland
John B. Ayre (1850–1915), merchant and political figure in Newfoundland, son of Charles Ayre
Keegan Ayre (born 1988), Canadian soccer player
Kristian Ayre (born 1977), Canadian actor
Lewis H.M. Ayre (1914–1985), Canadian businessman
Richard James Ayre, English journalist
Sanjay Ayre (born 1980), Jamaican sprinter
William Ayre (1782 or 1783–1855), Canadian educator